November 25 - Eastern Orthodox liturgical calendar - November 27

All fixed commemorations below are observed on December 9 by Orthodox Churches on the Old Calendar.

For November 26, Orthodox Churches on the Old Calendar commemorate the Saints listed on November 13.

Saints

 Venerable James the Solitary of Syria (457)
 Venerable Chaeremon.
 Saint Peter of Jerusalem, Patriarch of Jerusalem (552) 
 Venerable Stylianos of Paphlagonia, monk (6th century) 
 Venerable Acacius of Mt. Latros, who is mentioned in The Ladder (6th century) (see also: November 29)
 Venerable Silas, Bishop of Corinth in Persia.
 Saint Procopius of Persia. 
 Venerable Alypius the Stylite of Adrianopolis (608 or 640)
 Venerable Nikon Metanoeite, "Preacher of Repentance" (988)

Pre-Schism Western saints

 Saint Amator, Bishop of Autun in France (3rd century)
 Saint Siricius, Pope of Rome (399) 
 Saint Basolus (Basle), a French Benedictine monk at Verzy near Rheims, then a hermit for forty years on a hill near the city, confessor, wonderworker (c. 620)
 Saint Martin of Arades, a monk at Corbie Abbey in France (726)
 Saint Conrad of Constance, Bishop of Constance in Germany, went on pilgrimage to the Holy Land three times (975)
 Saint Vacz, a hermit in Visegrád in the mountains of Pilis in Hungary (11th century)

Post-Schism Orthodox saints

 Venerables Athanasius and Theodosius of Cherepovets, disciples of St. Sergius of Radonezh (c. 1388)
 Saint Innocent of Irkutsk, first bishop of Irkutsk, Apostle to Siberia and Wonderworker (1731)
 New Martyr George of Chios, at Kydonias in Asia Minor (1807)

New martyrs and confessors

 New Hieromartyrs Nicholas Zamaraev, John Vinogradov, George Kolokolov, Priests (1937)
 New Hieromartyrs Nazarius Gribkov, Basil Agafonikov, Basil Kolosov, Elijah Zachatesky, Basil Studnitsyn, Daniel Meshaninov, and Michael Zelentsovsky, Priests (1937)
 New Hieromartyr Tikhon (Buzov), Archimandrite, of Donskoy Monastery, Moscow (1937)
 New Hieromartyr Peter Tsarapkin (after 1937)

Other commemorations

 Dedication of the Church of St. George at Kiev (1054)
 Dedication of the Church of St. George in the Kyparissia district of Constantinople.
 Repose of Sophianos of Dryinoupolis, Orthodox missionary in Ottoman Epirus, considered the forerunner of Cosmas of Aetolia in the region (1711)

Icon gallery

Notes

References

Sources
 November 26 / December 9. Orthodox Calendar (PRAVOSLAVIE.RU).
 December 9 / November 26. Holy Trinity Russian Orthodox Church (A parish of the Patriarchate of Moscow).
 November 26. OCA - The Lives of the Saints.
 The Autonomous Orthodox Metropolia of Western Europe and the Americas (ROCOR). St. Hilarion Calendar of Saints for the year of our Lord 2004. St. Hilarion Press (Austin, TX). p. 88.
 The Twenty-Sixth Day of the Month of November. Orthodoxy in China.
 November 26. Latin Saints of the Orthodox Patriarchate of Rome.
 The Roman Martyrology. Transl. by the Archbishop of Baltimore. Last Edition, According to the Copy Printed at Rome in 1914. Revised Edition, with the Imprimatur of His Eminence Cardinal Gibbons. Baltimore: John Murphy Company, 1916. p. 364-365.
 Rev. Richard Stanton. A Menology of England and Wales, or, Brief Memorials of the Ancient British and English Saints Arranged According to the Calendar, Together with the Martyrs of the 16th and 17th Centuries. London: Burns & Oates, 1892. pp. 566–567.
Greek Sources
 Great Synaxaristes:  26 ΝΟΕΜΒΡΙΟΥ. ΜΕΓΑΣ ΣΥΝΑΞΑΡΙΣΤΗΣ.
  Συναξαριστής. 26 Νοεμβρίου. ECCLESIA.GR. (H ΕΚΚΛΗΣΙΑ ΤΗΣ ΕΛΛΑΔΟΣ). 
  26/11/2015. Ορθόδοξος Συναξαριστής. 
Russian Sources
  9 декабря (26 ноября). Православная Энциклопедия под редакцией Патриарха Московского и всея Руси Кирилла (электронная версия). (Orthodox Encyclopedia - Pravenc.ru).
  26 ноября по старому стилю / 9 декабря по новому стилю. Русская Православная Церковь - Православный церковный календарь на 2018 год.

November in the Eastern Orthodox calendar